This is a list of streets and squares in New York City named after a person, organized by borough.

Manhattan
 Allen Street – Captain William Henry Allen, the youngest person to command a Navy ship in the War of 1812.
 Ann Street – Ann White, wife of developer and merchant Capt. Thomas White
 Astor Place and Astor Row – John Jacob Astor and other members of the Astor family, landowners
 Baxter Street - Lt. Col. Charles Baxter, a hero of the Mexican War who was killed in Chapultepec in 1849.
 Bayard Street and Hester Street – Hester Bayard
 Beach Street – Paul Bache, the son-in-law of Anthony Lispenard, who owned Lispenard Meadows, just south of what is now Canal Street
 Beekman Place, Beekman Street, William Street – Wilhelmus Beekman
 Bleecker Street – Anthony Bleecker (1770–1827). a lawyer, poet and friend of Washington Irving and William Cullen Bryant, because the street ran through Bleecker's farm.
 Bogardus Place – the Bogardus family, including Everardus Bogardus and James Bogardus
 Bond Street - William Bond, city surveyor.
 Bowery - an anglicization of the Dutch bouwerie, derived from an antiquated Dutch word for "farm": In the 17th century the area contained many large farms.
 Broome Street – John Broome, lieutenant governor of New York
 Cabrini Boulevard – Mother Cabrini
 Charles Street – Charles Christopher Amos, landowner
 Christopher Street – Charles Christopher Amos, landowner. Prior to 1799 known as Skinner Road after Col. William Skinner, son-in-law of landowner Adm. Peter Warren
 Columbus Circle – for the quadcentennial of the first voyage of Christopher Columbus
 Cortlandt Street – for the Cortlandt family, landowners
 Delancey Street – James De Lancey, who served as chief justice, lieutenant governor, and acting colonial governor of the Province of New York, and who owned a farm located in what is now the Lower East Side
 Frederick Douglass Boulevard - named after Frederick Douglass, African American abolitionist, orator, newspaper publisher, and author who is famous for his first autobiography, Narrative of the Life of Frederick Douglass, an American Slave, Written by Himself.
 Doyers Street - Hendrik Doyer, an 18th-century Dutch immigrant who bought the property facing the Bowery in 1791
 Dyckman Street – named for Dutch farmer William Dyckman, whose family owned over 250 acres (11,000,000 sq ft) of farmland in the area; the Dyckman House, located nearby at the corner of Broadway and 204th Street, was built by William Dyckman in 1784 and is the oldest remaining farmhouse in Manhattan, and many consider it the border between Washington Heights and Inwood.
 Eldridge Street – Lt. Joseph C. Eldridge, killed in the War of 1812
 Elizabeth Street - Elizabeth Rynders, wife of Nicholas Bayard II, and daughter of Hester Rynders Bayard.
 Essex Street - Essex county of England
 Forsyth Street – Lt. Col. Benjamin Forsyth
 Fulton Street – Robert Fulton
 Gansevoort Street - Peter Gansevoort, a hero in the siege of Fort Stanwix (Fort Schuyler) which contributed to the downfall of Burgoyne's army at the Battle of Saratoga during the Revolutionary War. 
 Gay Street – possibly "R. Gay," apocryphally to Sidney Howard Gay.
 Gold Street - Nathan Gold, an American colonial leader and deputy governor of the Colony of Connecticut. 
 Gouverneur Street - Abraham Gouverneur, a 15th-century French immigrant turned big-time New York political activist.
 Great Jones Street – Samuel Jones, "The Father of The New York Bar"
 Henry Street – Henry Rutgers, American Revolutionary War hero
 Houston Street (pronounced  ) – William Houstoun, Founding Father.
 Hudson Street - Henry Hudson, an English sea explorer and navigator during the early 17th century, best known for his explorations of present-day Canada and parts of the northeastern United States. Also named after the Hudson River
 Irving Place – Washington Irving known for his A History of New York and short stories like The Legend of Sleepy Hollow
 John Street - John Haberdinck, a wealthy Dutch shoemaker 
 Jones Street - Doctor Gardner Jones
 Peter Jennings Way – Peter Jennings, ABC News anchor
 Juan Pablo Duarte Boulevard (part of Saint Nicholas Avenue) – Juan Pablo Duarte, a founding father of the Dominican Republic
 Kenmare Street - Kenmare, a small town in County Kerry, Ireland
 Lafayette Street – Marquis de Lafayette, a French hero of the American Revolutionary War
 LaGuardia Place – Fiorello LaGuardia, Mayor of New York City
 Lenox Avenue – James Lenox, philanthropist
 Ludlow Street – Augustus Ludlow, War of 1812 naval hero
 MacDougal Street – Alexander McDougall, Revolutionary War hero
 Madison Avenue and Madison Street – James Madison, fourth president of the United States
 Malcolm X Boulevard (co-named with Lenox Avenue) – Malcolm X American human rights activist
 Mercer Street – Hugh Mercer, American Revolutionary War figure
 Mott Street - Joseph Mott, a butcher and tavern owner who provided support to the rebel forces in the American Revolution.
 Mulberry Street - mulberry trees

 Nassau Street – William of Nassau
 North Moore Street – Benjamin Moore (bishop), second Episcopal bishop of New York, president of Columbia University
 Rivington Street – James Rivington, Revolutionary War-era publisher
 Rutgers Street – Henry Rutgers, American Revolutionary War hero
 St. Mark's Place
 Saint Nicholas Avenue – Saint Nicholas
 Stanton Street – George Stanton, an associate of landowner James De Lancey
 Stuyvesant Street – Peter Stuyvesant, last governor of New Netherland, who owned the land
 Sullivan Street – John Sullivan, American Revolutionary War general
 Thompson Street – William Thompson, Revolutionary War general
 Vanderbilt Avenue – Vanderbilt family, who owned Grand Central Terminal, the construction of which predated construction of the road
 Varick Street – Richard Varick, American Revolutionary War figure and Mayor of New York City
 Vesey Street (pronounced VEE-see) – after Rev. William Vesey
 Washington Street – George Washington, first president of the United States
 William Street - Wilhelmus Beekman
 Wooster Street – David Wooster, American Revolutionary War hero
 Worth Street – William J. Worth, American officer during the War of 1812, the Second Seminole War, and the Mexican–American War
 Vandam Street - Anthony Van Dam, a wine and liquor dealer who was active in civil affair.

Squares 
 Chatham Square – William Pitt, 1st Earl of Chatham, and Prime Minister of Great Britain
 Duffy Square – Chaplain Francis P. Duffy of New York's 69th Infantry Regiment
 Hanover Square – the House of Hanover
 Herald Square – New York Herald
 Lincoln Square – a local landowner
 Madison Square – James Madison, fourth President of the United States
 Times Square – The New York Times
 Tompkins Square Park – Daniel D. Tompkins (1774–1825), Vice President of the United States
 Verdi Square – Giuseppe Verdi, Italian composer
 Washington Square Park – George Washington
 Worth Square – William J. Worth

The Bronx
 Bruckner Boulevard and Bruckner Expressway – Henry Bruckner, politician and longtime borough president
 Major Deegan Expressway – William Francis Deegan, an architect, organizer of the American Legion, major in the Army Corps of Engineers, and Democratic Party political leader in New York City
 Southern Boulevard (formerly Theodore Kazimiroff Boulevard) – Theodore Kazimiroff, Bronx historian and a founder of The Bronx County Historical Society. Although part of Southern Boulevard was renamed after Kazimiroff in 1980, his name was removed from street signs in 2011 because he was not well known even among many Bronx locals. This was one of the few instances where an eponymous street has reverted to its old name.

Brooklyn
 Albee Square – named after Edward Franklin Albee II
 Adams Street - named after John Adams 
 Cadman Plaza - named after Samuel Parkes Cadman
 Clark Street - named after Lewis Clark 
 Cropsey Avenue - named after the Cropsey family
 DeKalb Avenue – named after Johann de Kalb
 Duffield Street - named after John Duffield
 Fulton Street – named after Robert Fulton
 Hoyt Street - named after Jesse Hoyt 
 Joralemon Street - named after Tumis Joralemon 
 Lawrence Street - named after William Beach Lawrence
 Linden Boulevard - named after Pierre Léonard Vander Linden
 Madison Street - named after James Madison
 Malcolm X Boulevard - named after Reverend Malcolm X
 McGuinness Boulevard – named after Peter McGuinness
 Nostrand Avenue - named after Gerret Noorstrandt
 Schermerhorn Street - named after Peter Schermerhorn   
 Tilden Avenue - named after Samuel J. Tilden
 Vanderbilt Avenue – named after Vanderbilt family

Queens
 Francis Lewis Boulevard – Francis Lewis, local resident and signer of the Declaration of Independence
 Jackie Robinson Parkway – Jackie Robinson – Major League Baseball player
 Roosevelt Avenue – Theodore Roosevelt
 Steinway Street – named for the makers of the famed Steinway piano. Their factory is located in Astoria, Queens, where this street runs through.
 Van Wyck Expressway (formerly Van Wyck Boulevard) – named for Robert Anderson Van Wyck, first mayor of New York City after the consolidation of the five boroughs

Staten Island
 Father Capodanno Boulevard – Vincent R. Capodanno, killed in action in the Vietnam War
 Hylan Boulevard – John F. Hylan, Mayor of New York City

See also

 List of eponymous roads in London
 List of eponymous streets in Metro Manila

References

Further reading
 New York Songlines: Virtual Walking Tours of Manhattan Streets

 
 
New York City-related lists
New York City
New York City
New York (state) transportation-related lists
New York